WBEM may refer to:

 WBEM (AM), a former American radio station
 Web-Based Enterprise Management, in computing
 WBEM Services Specification, a Java Specification Request

See also
 WebM, an audio-video container for use with HTML5 video